Fury is the 12th studio album by the Italian film music composer Stefano Lentini. It was released on November 16, 2018 through Coloora Records. It is an alternative-classic project with a symphonic prominence, prog-electronic and folk influences. The instrumental concept album finds its roots in the exploration of anger as an oft-neglected feeling and the search of its meaning. Fury  is a journey through the universe of human emotions, symbolised by the stunning complexity of cosmos and its savage celestial bodies. 
The album was reviewed by Rolling Stone as “A journey into the dark side of the human mind”.

Track listing

Personnel
Stefano Lentini – acoustic guitar, keyboards, bass guitar, percussion
Gilda Buttà – piano
Marco Rovinelli – drums
Pasquale Laino – sax
Andrea Marzari – electric guitar 
Federica Balucani – vocal 
Antonella Capurso – alto 
Adriano Caroletti – tenor 
Luca Cipriano – clarinet 
Alessandro Gwis – piano 
Paolo Innarella – bansuri 
Paul Andrew – dumbek 
Juanjo Mosalini – accordion 
Luca Peverini – cello 
Nathalie Reaux – speech 
Lorenzo Rundo – viola 
Mauro Tortorelli – violin 
PMCE Parco della Musica Contemporanea Ensemble – orchestra 
The City of Rome Contemporary Music Ensemble – orchestra
Tonino Battista – conductor 
Emanuele Bossi – conductor
Flavio Emilio Scogna – conductor

Design
Andy Gilmore – artwork
Riccardo Fidenzi – design
Elisa Fiore – assistant
Stefano Lentini – art direction

Technical
Stefano Lentini – production
Geoff Foster – mixing
Stephen Marcussen – mastering
Stefano Lentini – engineering
Simone Sciumbata – engineering
Davide Palmiotto – engineering
Giovanni Caruso – engineering
Andrea Secchi – engineering
Paolo Modugno engineering
Diego Guarnieri – additional arranger 
Damien Salançon – additional arranger
Giovanni Bacalov – additional arranger 
Paolo Annunziato – assistant, copyist
Annalisa Bearzatto – coordinator and creative contents
Açelya Yönaç – translator

References

External links
Official website
  www.furythealbum.com
Composer's website
  www.stefanolentini.com

2018 albums
Stefano Lentini albums